

Y'Garon
Y'Garon is a demon who has clashed with Marada the She-Wolf and Dracula.

Yandroth

Yandroth was the humanoid Scientist Supreme of the "otherdimensional" planet "Yann" and a would-be-conqueror who, with his robot Voltorg, has fought Doctor Strange as a counterpart to the latter's title of Sorcerer Supreme. Doctor Strange defeats Yandroth, sending him to seemingly fall forever through an alternate dimension, the Dimension of Dreams.

There, he gains great magical knowledge and learns that he could gain great power by destroying a world. He returns to Earth and constructs an "Omegatron", although he suffers injuries received when he was hit by a truck in New York City. His physical body dies, thus activating the Omegatron. As the Omegatron, he battles Doctor Strange, Namor, and the Hulk, who come together as the Defenders for the first time. Yandroth is placed under a time displacement spell by Doctor Strange.

The Omegatron is eventually released from the time displacement spell and battled Namor, the Hulk, Valkyrie, and Namorita and was destroyed. Yandroth's spirit next possesses a young female chemist to telepathically attack the heroes; however, he is defeated by the Defenders again.
 
Although Yandroth is dead, his spirit is still capable of taking possession of a living human's mind. Taking the form of a vagrant, he is discovered by Patsy Walker. Seemingly an innocent, she rescues him, allowing him to regain his strength and capture her. He becomes a nihilist and crafts a plan to end the world. He summons monsters from all over like Negative Zone Borers, Mindless Ones, Toad Men, Dark-Crawler, Quasimodo, Warlord Kaa and his Shadow Warriors, Living Erasers, Gorgilla, Vi-Locks, and the Lizard Men of Tok. This attack involved many superhero teams. Most of the New York-based heroes are tied up confronting destructive, mindless monstrosities. Alpha Flight is attacked by Warlord Kaa and his Shadow Warriors. Yandroth causes a group of Living Erasers to appear in the Tokyo Headquarters of Big Hero 6. Lizard Men from Tok attack the island nation of Genosha. Gorgilla subdues the Avengers by dropping a building on them. It turns out he is utilizing the captured form of Gaea, the spirit of the Earth, to summon the monsters. Patsy, who had escaped and learned this, tells the Defenders, who were currently comprising Namor, Hulk, Doctor Strange, and Silver Surfer. The superheroes battles Yandroth has caused has given him enough power to summon the Ravagers of Creation. Four elemental creatures confront the Defenders, who are unable to stop them individually. They attack the Stone creature, disabling the spell needed to destroy the world. This frees Gaea and kills Yandroth. In his dying breath as the Hulk and Namor fight, he realizes the Defenders hate each other. Yandroth uses his powers to curse the four original members so that they must come and work together in times of a severe crisis. This involves uncontrollable teleportation, affecting all four of the heroes. Yandroth's curse caused the Defenders to work together against a plot by Lorelei and Pluto. The curse that Yandroth placed on the four original members of the Defenders was also tied to Yann and adding into Yandroth's powers.

When the four Defenders members became The Order for a short time, their curse started to cause Yandroth to slowly reform. He started to slowly materialize in smoky form above a throne. Yandroth then began to materialize in an all-powerful mist-like form. When he was denied of the final power he needed when the Order wouldn't attack him, Yandroth regressed to human form as Christopher Ganyrog took Yandroth back to Yann to stand trial for his crimes.

Yandroth is featured in the limited series "The Last Defenders", disguised as a businessman after he escaped, killed the Ganyrogs, and took over Yann. Assisted by the floating head of the entity known as the "Recorder", he attempts to manipulate his way into gaining god-level powers. Nighthawk, Colossus, Blazing Skull She-Hulk, and Warlord Krang battle the group the Sons of the Serpent which culminates in a confrontation with Yandroth. Yandroth manipulates time and forces Nighthawk to battle a twisted version of his old team the Squadron Sinister before being rescued by a future incarnation of the Defenders, who with Yandroth disappear once the threat is over.

Mariko Yashida

Shingen Yashida

Yellow Claw

Yellowjacket

Hank Pym

Rita DeMara

Darren Cross

Yeti

Inhuman
This Yeti, an Inhuman mutated by the Terrigen Mist, was created by Stan Lee and Jack Kirby and first appeared in Fantastic Four #99.

The character joins the superhero team First Line, but leaves after losing control during a fight, and lives in a temple in the Himalayas for a period. While looking for Crystal, the Human Torch encounters Yeti and, startled by his appearance, attacks him. Yeti runs from the Torch's attack and tells the other Inhumans that they are under attack.

Yeti has inhuman strength and razor-sharp claws and teeth. He is easily angered and suffers from bouts of insanity. His savage, animal nature during these bouts makes him almost unbeatable.

Weapon P.R.I.M.E.
This Yeti is a member of the covert Canadian superhuman group Weapon P.R.I.M.E., and has fought X-Force and the Alpha Flight member Northstar. He has superhuman strength, claws, and an enhanced healing factor.

Other versions of Yeti
In the Age of Apocalypse reality, Yeti appears as a member of the Brotherhood of Chaos.

Ho Yinsen

Professor Ho Yinsen is a supporting character of Iron Man in the Marvel Comics universe. The character, created by Stan Lee, Larry Lieber and Don Heck, first appeared in Tales of Suspense #39 (March 1963).

Original plotline
Professor Yinsen was a physicist, engineer and pacifist from the fictional nation of Timbetpal; while Tony Stark was in college, Stark had greatly admired the older man's work. In his old age, Yinsen was captured in Vietnam by the Communist warlord Wong-Chu before American arms manufacturer and engineer Tony Stark was also captured. Stark's US military convoy had tripped a land mine and he was injured with shrapnel that was slowly moving toward his heart. Yinsen builds a magnetic chest plate and affixes it to Stark's chest, thus preventing the shrapnel from reaching his heart, thereby saving Stark's life and keeping him alive. Wong-Chu then orders Yinsen and Stark to build weapons for him. Instead, Yinsen helps Stark secretly build the first Iron Man armor, which includes a device for Stark's heart to keep him alive. Yinsen sacrifices his life distracting Wong-Chu to buy time for Stark to power up his armor. Stark dons the armor, becoming Iron Man, and defeats Wong-Chu, apparently killing him in the explosion of munitions shed, before freeing all other prisoners.

Twelve of Wong-Chu's former prisoners were disciples of Yinsen; one of these disciples (Sun-Tao) leads them to establish a quasi-religious cult called the Sons of Yinsen. The Sons of Yinsen develop very advanced technology from notes in Yinsen's journal that he had written before his death; they use this technology to create the apparent utopia of New Timbetpal, a floating, ambulatory, usually-cloaked city in the sky. It is revealed that Wong-Chu survived the munitions shed explosion and that Yinsen's brain was preserved alive, salvaged by an interdimensional merchant called Doctor Midas. Midas sold Yinsen's brain in an auction to Wong-Chu. Iron Man, driven by his own guilt that he never looked for Yinsen himself, simply assuming that his friend had been killed while focusing on his own escape, helps the Sons of Yinsen defeat Wong-Chu, who is beheaded by one of the Sons of Yinsen, and recover Yinsen's brain.

The Sons of Yinsen attempt to resurrect Professor Yinsen by placing his brain inside a sentient Iron Man armor, which is actually under Ultron's control. Falsely believing Ultron to be Yinsen resurrected, the Sons of Yinsen follow directives toward planning for a war; only Sun-Tao refuses to obey, for which he is displaced as leader of the Sons of Yinsen by a man named Tyger Minn. Ultron leads the Sons of Yinsen to reveal themselves to the public and establish the Church of Yinsen. Sun-Tao recovers Yinsen's brain, and then Iron Man, Sun-Tao, and Jocasta work together to defeat Ultron and the Sons of Yinsen and free Ultron's prisoner Antigone. Ultron attempts to blow up the floating city of the Sons of Yinsen to kill all of them as well as Iron Man; however, the sentient armor has apparently absorbed enough of the thoughts of Yinsen that part of it acts to save Iron Man and Sun-Tao from the destruction of the city.

Retcon plotline
In the "Execute Program" story arc of The Invincible Iron Man (vol. 4), a retcon establishes that Tony Stark and Ho Yinsen had been captured not by Communists in Vietnam, but rather by the Taliban in Afghanistan, and that Yinsen was murdered under orders from five terrorists (Dennis Kellard, Ara Tanzerian, Zakim Karzai, Aftaab Lemar, and Kareem Mahwash Najeeb). Before he died, Yinsen had been coerced into implanting a "bio-magnetic receiving unit" inside Stark's brain. In a failed attempt to recover the control device for the implant, the terrorists send hitman Andrei Gorlovich to murder Yinsen's wife. Years later, some of the five terrorists are now diplomats. Yinsen's grieving teenage son (whose name is never revealed) blamed Stark for his parents' deaths and takes control of the device in Stark's brain to mind-control into assassinating all five of the former terrorists. Stark confronts Yinsen's son to try to prove innocence, but the latter is sniped and killed by a S.H.I.E.L.D. agent acting on Nick Fury's orders.

As part of the All-New, All-Different Marvel, Yinsen is revealed to have a daughter: Toni Ho.

Ho Yinsen in other media

Television
 A character based on Ho Yinsen named Wellington Yinsen appears in Iron Man (1994), voiced by Neil Ross. This version worked with Professor Arnold Brock before the latter became the Mandarin, who captured Yinsen and Tony Stark to build armor for his henchmen. After Yinsen builds armor for Stark so he can escape, the former sacrifices himself to save the latter from the Mandarin.
 Professor Ho Yinsen appears in Marvel Anime: Iron Man, voiced by Hiroaki Hirata in the Japanese version and by Kyle Hebert in the English dub. Similarly to the Iron Man (2008) incarnation, this version built an electromagnet to keep Tony Stark alive. After helping Stark escape, Yinsen survived, but was convinced by Japan's Minister of Defense, Kuroda, to join Zodiac and steal Stark's "Iron Man Dio" armor to serve him. Yinsen eventually has a change of heart, leading to Kuroda killing him.
 Dr. Yinsen appears in season two of Iron Man: Armored Adventures as an old friend of Howard Stark and a Stark International medical specialist who saved Tony after his plane accident and created his artificial heart.

Film
 A character based on Ho Yinsen named Ho Yen appears in The Invincible Iron Man, voiced by an uncredited voice actor. He helps James "Rhodey" Rhodes treat Tony Stark's damaged heart after being captured for attempting to dig up an ancient city and relates the legend of the Mandarin to them before Yen is killed by Wong-Chu.
 Professor Ho Yinsen appears in the Marvel Cinematic Universe (MCU) film Iron Man (2008), portrayed by Shaun Toub. This version is a doctor and engineer from the small fictional Afghanistan village of Gulmira who was captured by a local branch of the Ten Rings alongside Tony Stark. After building an electromagnet to save Stark's life, Yinsen assists him in creating a miniaturized arc reactor and the first Iron Man armor before sacrificing himself to buy time for Stark's armor to boot up. Stark tries to save him, but Yinsen reveals his death was always part of the plan so he can reunite with his dead family and urges Stark to not waste his life.
 Yinsen makes a cameo appearance in a flashback in the MCU film Iron Man 3 (2013), portrayed again by Shaun Toub.

Video games
Ho Yinsen appears in the 2008 Iron Man film tie-in game, voiced by Shaun Toub. Unlike in the film, this version sacrifices himself to prevent the Ten Rings from acquiring Tony Stark's notes on the Iron Man armor and the ammunition that was stored with them.

Ymir

Yondu

Yon-Rogg

Dale and Stacey Yorkes

Kagenobu Yoshioka

Kagenobu Yoshioka is a character in Marvel Comics. The character, created by Akira Yoshida, first appeared in Elektra: The Hand #1 (November 2004). He is a ninja and founder of The Hand. Yoshioka was the son of a samurai who lived with his single mother. When coming home from fishing, Yoshioka sees his mother about to be raped by a foreigner. Angered, he kills the foreigner, but his mother takes the blame. His mother is taken away, leaving behind a bloodied hand print on his shirt which would become his emblem. Saburo Ishiyama takes him in and becomes his sensei, training him in the ways of bushido. After training for ten years, Yoshioka leaves the school to start his adult life. After three years of training, Yoshioka is asked to return to his sensei's school because of his mentor's death. He makes amends with his old rival Daisuke Sasaki and together decide to rebel against the government by forming with other Japanese school leaders. The Hand is visited by a foreigner and his daughter Eliza Martinez who come to the school hoping to be trained. After turning the two down several times, Kagenobu finally accepts which angers Sasaki. Kagenobu personally trains Eliza and has Eliza kill another foreigner simply for not being Japanese. He informs Eliza of being full of anger and that is why Eliza chose to train with him, afterwards the two fall in love. Sasaki sends a member of the Hand to kill Eliza but fails. Kagenobu learns that the Hand has become a mercenaries for hire organization; realizing that his school is slowly getting out of his control, Kagenobu fights and kills Sasaki. Kagenobu and Eliza fight the Hand's members but Kagenobu is slain by his once loyal students, and the grief-stricken Eliza kills herself as well.

Kagenobu Yoshioka in other media
The character is renamed Nobu Yoshioka and appears as a recurring character in the live action series Daredevil, played by Peter Shinkoda. The character was initially named Hachiro but this gets changed shortly before filming began, and is depicted with similarities to Kirigi. In season one, he is a representative of the Hand and one of the people responsible for Wilson Fisk's criminal empire. Nobu attempts to smuggle a child known as "Black Sky" into the city with Fisk's aid but Matt Murdock and Stick prevent this, with Stick killing the child. Angered by Murdock's constant interference, Nobu later attacks Murdock, severely wounding the vigilante before Nobu is defeated by being set on fire, apparently killing him. In season two, Nobu returns from the dead, albeit with a scarred face. He battles Daredevil once more, but the vigilante manages to hold his own and forces Nobu to flee. The Hand kidnap and tortures Stick, but Daredevil and Elektra arrive and battle him. Nobu reveals that Elektra is the new Black Sky, and is convinced that Daredevil is the only thing standing between the Hand's total domination. Nobu later fights Daredevil and Elektra. After he accidentally kills Elektra, Daredevil (overcome with rage) attacks Nobu while his men are killed by the Punisher, resulting in Daredevil tossing Nobu off the building. But Nobu survives the fall only to be beheaded by Stick, which kills him permanently.

Yukio

Yukon Jack

Yukon Jack (Yukotujakzurjimozoata) is a character in the Marvel Universe, a member of the superhero team Alpha Flight. The character, created by Scott Lobdell and Clayton Henry, first appeared in Alpha Flight (vol. 3) #1 (May 2004). He views himself as a demi-god, making references to not being a normal human. When he was electrocuted by Hiro Takachiho, his skeleton showed few similarities to a normal human's. After the series' conclusion, he married Snowbird.

References

Marvel Comics characters: Y, List of